Dominique Lecointe (born 22 March 1957) is a French rower. He competed at the 1980, 1984, 1988 and the 1992 Summer Olympics.

References

External links
 

1957 births
Living people
French male rowers
Olympic rowers of France
Rowers at the 1980 Summer Olympics
Rowers at the 1984 Summer Olympics
Rowers at the 1988 Summer Olympics
Rowers at the 1992 Summer Olympics
People from Boulogne-sur-Mer
Sportspeople from Pas-de-Calais